Joe Biden's immigration policy is primarily based on reversing many of the immigration policies of the previous Trump administration. During his first day in office, Biden reversed many of Trump's policies on immigration, such as halting the construction of the Mexican border wall, ending Trump's travel ban restricting travel from 14 countries, and an executive order to reaffirm protections for DACA recipients. The Biden administration and Department of Homeland Security, under leadership of Alejandro Mayorkas, dramatically reined in deportation practices of Immigration and Customs Enforcement (ICE), prioritizing national security and violent crime concerns over petty and nonviolent offenses. However, Biden has also faced criticism for extending Title 42, a Trump administration border restriction that arose due to the COVID-19 pandemic, as well as restarting the use of expediting families in Central America, which can cause families to be sent back in weeks, compared to years for an average immigration case. In the fiscal year 2021, the US Border Patrol confirmed more than 1.6 million encounters with migrants along the US-Mexico border, more than quadruple the number in the previous fiscal year and the largest annual total on record. In January 2023, Biden announced a program to strengthen the admission of immigrants from Cuba, Haiti, Nicaragua and Venezuela, while at the same time will crack down on those who fail to use the plan’s legal pathway and strengthen border security.

Background 
 Over 86 million people have immigrated to the U.S. legally since 1783, making immigrants a foundation to U.S. foreign policy. Immigration policies have changed from president to president, although most policies have closely aligned towards Democratic and Republican party values, depending on the president's associated political party.

Immigration to the United States is the international movement of non-U.S. nationals in order to reside permanently in the country. Immigration has been a major source of population growth and cultural change throughout much of U.S. history.

In absolute numbers, the United States has a larger immigrant population than any other country, with 47 million immigrants as of 2015. This represents 19.1% of the 244 million international migrants worldwide and 14.4% of the U.S. population. Some other countries have larger proportions of immigrants, such as Switzerland with 24.9% and Canada with 21.9%.

Immigration policy

Revocation of prior administration policies

On January 20, 2021, soon after his inauguration, Biden halted the construction of Trump's Mexican border wall, ending the national emergency declared by the Trump administration in February 2019.

Biden also ended the Trump travel ban, a series of three executive orders imposed by Donald Trump on 14 countries, most of them Muslim, in January 2017.

DACA 
Biden also reaffirmed protections to DACA recipients and urged Congress to enact permanent protections for the 700,000 undocumented immigrants benefited by the policy.

DED 
The same day, Biden sent a memorandum to the Department of State reinstating Deferred Enforced Departure (DED) for Liberians, deferring the deportation of any "person without nationality who last habitually resided in Liberia, who is present in the United States and who was under a grant of DED as of January 10, 2021" until June 30, 2022.

Deportations 

The administration also issued a pause on deportations from the Department of Homeland Security for the first 100 days of Biden's presidency.

On January 22, 2021, Texas Attorney General Ken Paxton sued the Biden administration on the grounds of violating Biden's written pledge to cooperatively work with the State of Texas.

On January 26, 2021, federal judge Drew B. Tipton blocked the Biden administration's 100-day deportation memorandum, citing that the state of Texas would indeed "suffer imminent and irreparable harm" and the restraining order requested by Paxton would not harm the administration nor the public.

In January 2022 the Biden administration deported Venezuelan migrants to Colombia without a chance to seek asylum after entering the United States from Mexico. The U.S. Department of Homeland Security declare it would deport Venezuelans to Colombia “on a regular basis", limited to migrants that resided in Colombia previously. In October, the Biden administration invoked Title 42, a Trump era measure, to expel Venezuelan migrants to Mexico. Amnesty International and Human Rights Watch criticized the decision. On November 15, 2022, the United States District Court for the District of Columbia ruled that expulsions under Title 42 were a violation of the Administrative Procedure Act and that it was an “arbitrary and capricious" violation of the Act. The ruling required the United States government to process all asylum seekers under immigrant law as previous to Title 42's implementation. The ruling was celebrated by the ACLU, a plaintiff in the case.

Mexico 

In January 2022, Biden called Mexican President Andrés Manuel López Obrador to speak about immigration, where Biden spoke of reducing immigration from Mexico to the United States by targeting the root causes, including $4 billion to aid development in El Salvador, Guatemala, and Honduras.

The U.S. Border Patrol made more than 1.7 million arrests of migrants crossing the U.S.-Mexico border illegally in fiscal year 2021, the highest number ever recorded.

US Citizenship Act of 2021 

On January 21, 2021, Biden proposed a bill that, if passed, would replace the word "alien" with "noncitizen" in United States immigration law.

On January 23, 2021, Biden introduced an immigration bill to Congress. As introduced, the bill would give a path to citizenship to 11 million undocumented immigrants currently living in the United States. The bill will also make it easier for foreign workers to stay in the U.S. It is likely the bill will be significantly more modest as it goes through Congress.

Refugee admissions 
On February 4, 2021, Biden signed an executive order aimed at rescinding some of Trump's immigration policies. It also called for a review to determine whether Afghan and Iraqi applicants for the Special Immigrant Visa were unduly delayed. The order also called for a report on the effect of man-made Climate change on environmental immigration to the United States. It reversed a 2019 executive order restricting federal funding for the resettlement of refugees unless state and local governments to consent to it. However, a federal judge already struck down the order in January 2020.

Biden said that he planned to raise the annual refugee admissions to 125,000 in fiscal year 2022, but on April 16, 2021, he signed an executive order maintaining the historically low cap on refugees set by the Trump administration (15,000 per year). Facing criticism over the decision, the administration backtracked and announced plans to increase the refugee cap by May 15. As of April 2021, Biden was on track to accept the fewest refugees of any modern president, resettling only 2,050 refugees at the halfway point of fiscal year 2021.

ICE 
On February 7, 2021, Biden began the implementation of new guidelines for Immigration and Customs Enforcement agents, forbidding or restricting them from seeking out deportations on the basis of "drug based crimes (less serious offenses), simple assault, DUI, money laundering, property crimes, fraud, tax crimes, solicitation, or charges without convictions," as stated by Tae Johnson, the acting director of ICE, instead prioritizing "violent behavior, well-documented gang affiliations," and a record of child abuse, murder, rape, and major drug infractions. Deportations merely on the basis of at least 10-year old felonies or "loose" gang affiliations would also be prevented. The guidelines also required permission from the director of ICE for agents to arrest suspects outside of jails and prisons. As of February 7, the guidelines are awaiting confirmation from Secretary of Homeland Security Alejandro Mayorkas.

On February 27, 2021, the Biden administration moved to expand the government's capacity to house migrant children as it attempts to respond to an increase in border crossings of unaccompanied minors, notably by its re-opening of a temporary influx holding facility in Carrizo Springs, Texas.

In January 2022, ICE reached a settlement in a class-action suit in Bakersfield, CA with advocates for health safety measures in the ICE detentions and agreed to pay $4 million in plaintiff's attorney costs.

US CBP 
The Biden administration issued an executive order restoring an Obama-era policy repealed by Trump that grants asylum to apprehended migrants fleeing domestic or gang violence, allowing them to stay in the United States while their case is being reviewed.

Reception 
In response to the series of executive orders signed on February 4, 2021, intended to rescind former President Donald Trump's policies regarding refugees and resettlement, Republican Senator Tom Cotton of Arkansas argued that Biden's relaxed immigration policy would "put American jobs and safety at risk during a pandemic." Cotton also argued in a Fox & Friends interview that "A lot of these migrants that are coming, we have no way to screen their backgrounds for either health or for security" in response to the Biden administration, a claim debunked by PolitiFact.

Advocacy groups 
President of the Lutheran Immigration and Refugee Service Krish O'Mara Vignarajah commended Biden's eight-fold increase of the refugee cap, stating that it would save the lives of "hundreds of thousands fleeing violence and persecution."

As many as 160 criminal justice and immigration advocacy groups, however, wrote and signed a letter arguing Biden simply reversing Trump's immigration policies would not be enough to achieve comprehensive immigration reform and racial justice, citing equally harmful immigration policies enacted during the Bush and Obama administrations such as Operation Streamline. Jacinta Gonzalez, representing Mijente, criticized Biden's initial immigration policy, arguing that "[Biden] said he would phase out private prisons but didn't end contracts with private detention centers where most immigrants are being locked up," in reference to Biden's termination of federal contracts with private prisons. Activists also referenced the Biden-Sanders Unity Task Forces, a group intended to bridge the divide between the moderate and progressive wings of the party, and whose recommendations included the end of "mass prosecutions of individuals who cross the border without regards to the facts and circumstances of their cases, through practices like Operation Streamline, that deny individuals their right to a fair hearing and due process," as well as the decriminalization of illegal immigration and prioritization of services to provide economic and humanitarian aid to undocumented immigrants. The groups also stated that several of the Trump administration's policies, most notably the family separation policy, had yet to be reversed by the president despite it being within his power.

In January 2023, advocates would condemn Biden's more tougher approach to immigration which involves plans to strengthen Title 42 deportations for immigrants who crossed the Southern U.S. border.

Immigration agencies 
In response to Biden's order on February 7, 2021, an anonymous ICE official chafed that the Biden administration had "abolished ICE without abolishing ICE [...]  The pendulum swing is so extreme. It literally feels like we've gone from the ability to fully enforce our immigration laws to now being told to enforce nothing." Other ICE officials and agents argued that said changes were more dramatic than even Biden promised during his campaign. On the other hand, former acting director of ICE under the Obama administration, John Sandweg, commended the actions, criticizing the Trump administration's policies as authoritarian and distracting from violent criminals, and drawing the comparison that "No one judges the FBI by the number of arrests they make. They judge them by the quality of arrests."

Polling 
A Morning Consult poll released in March 2021 found that 49% of American voters disapproved of Joe Biden's immigration policy with only 40% approving. Overall, 70% of Democrats and 11% of Republicans approve of Joe Biden's immigration policies. Another poll by The Associated Press-NORC Center for Public Affairs Research released in April 2021 found that only 42% of Americans approved of Joe Biden's immigration policies with 74% of Democrats and 10% of Republicans approving. In addition, 74% of African Americans, 50% of Hispanics, and 34% of white Americans approve of Biden's immigration policy.

Future policies 
President Joe Biden has hoped to continue the progress that has been made in U.S. immigration policy before the Trump administration. Biden hopes to further progress the U.S. immigration system through pushing for policies that will make the pathway to citizenship easier for immigrants. Pathways include temporary legal status for undocumented immigrants, giving them the ability to apply for green cards after a couple of years. Pathways to citizenship are small part of Biden’s planned immigration policy, Biden hopes to reverse the damage done by the Trump administration and plans to create a task force designed to specifically reunite and keep separated families back together, that were affected by the Trump administrations immigration policies. Continuously, Biden’s plans for modernizing the immigration continue, as president Biden also plans to lighten enforcement on the public charge, which previously denied immigrants green cards if they were to use government aided services.

References

External links
 

Policies of Joe Biden
Immigration policies in the United States